KZLZ (105.3 FM) is a Regional Mexican radio station that serves Tucson, Arizona. KZLZ is licensed to broadcast from Casas Adobes, Arizona. KZLZ was owned by Entravision Communications Corporation until September 5, 2006, when it was acquired by Todd Robinson for $4,750,000. On December 1, 2006, the FCC approved  the voluntary transfer of the license to KZLZ, LLC.

History
In the early 1990s, KCDX was known as 'X 105.3', and was a rock station. Programming was delivered via satellite.

In 1993, KCDX was sold to Entravision, who changed the call letters to KZLZ, and flipped the format to Spanish language Regional Mexican.

Signal and boosters

Because of the distance between the KZLZ transmitter and the station's target market (Tucson), KZLZ uses two boosters to strengthen the signal in Tucson.

KZLZ-FM1 and KZLZ-FM2 are licensed to Tucson, and the transmitters are located in northeast Tucson. KZLZ-FM1 operates with an ERP of 40 watts, and KZLZ-FM2 operates at 67 watts.

See also
 List of radio stations in Arizona

External links

Mexican-American culture in Arizona
ZLZ
Regional Mexican radio stations in the United States
Radio stations established in 1988
ZLZ
1988 establishments in Arizona